Peter Bussian is an American independent filmmaker, photographer and visual media consultant who is known mainly for his work with refugees and other international development issues. He has received awards for his photographs from the International Photography Awards (Lucies) and Interaction.

Bussian has held several photographic exhibitions, including "The Afghans: Pictures of Resilience 2001 – 2011", which was exhibited at Gallery 169 and Sharq Gallery, both in Los Angeles.  The exhibit was also on display at the Council on Foreign Relations in New York throughout 2012.  He is the author and photographer of the book "Passage to Afghanistan" (Skyhorse, 2016).

Bussian played the lead role in Afghan director Siddiq Barmak's film, Opium War, which was Afghanistan's official submission to the 2009 Academy Awards and won several film festival awards, including the Golden Marc’Aurelio Critics’ Award for Best Film at the Rome Film Festival.

Bussian is currently developing several independent feature film projects, including Scarlet Poppy, an authentic love story set in Afghanistan.  The project has been featured at the Busan International Film Festival, International Film Festival of India, the Independent Filmmaker Project "No Borders" and the Dubai International Film Festival

In 2020, Bussian released a book of portraits entitled "Trans New York: Photos and Stories of Transgender New Yorkers." The book was published by Apollo Publishers, with a foreword by transgender activist and author Abby Stein.

References

External links
 Official website
 
 
 

Living people
1962 births
American filmmakers
American photographers
University of Colorado alumni
Columbia University alumni